Keidran Jones (born 15 April 1987), better known by his stage name Iyaz, is a British Virgin Islands singer and songwriter, formerly signed with the record label Beluga Heights Records. He is known for his singles "Replay", "Solo" and "Pretty Girls". He released his debut album Replay in 2010.

Life and career

1987–2010: Early life and career beginnings
Iyaz aka Keidran Jones was born in 1987, into a musical family. He grew up in Tortola in the Virgin Islands. Iyaz studied digital recording at New England Institute of Technology. He was featured on the track "Island Girls" by Out Da Box Family, which achieved radio success in the Caribbean. Sean Kingston found Iyaz through his Myspace page in 2008 and later signed him to a recording contract with Time Is Money/Beluga Heights. Michael Nguyen introduced him to producer and Beluga Heights head J.R. Rotem. He released "Replay" in 2009, which peaked at number 2 on the Billboard Hot 100 and at number 1 in several territories, including the United Kingdom. His second single "Solo" was released in February 2010, and peaked at number 32 on the Hot 100. He also took part in recording the Haiti charity single, "We Are the World 25 for Haiti". His debut album, Replay was released in 2010, and he was also featured on Jake Zyrus’s single "Pyramid". In an interview with HitQuarters, Rotem described Iyaz's creative perfectionism:

"Where as [sic] others might work on several songs in one day, he might sit there and work on one song for days. The end result that he gets is usually an absolute gem, so heartfelt and genuine."

Iyaz also appeared on the fourth season of Hannah Montana, Hannah Montana Forever and made a song with Miley Cyrus called "Gonna Get This", which is featured on the Hannah Montana Forever soundtrack album.

2011–present: Replay and Aurora
In 2011, Iyaz played his part in Big Time Rush's song "If I Ruled the World". Iyaz released "Last Forever" with David Guetta as the producer, and its follow-up, "At Last". Iyaz was featured on New Boyz's single "Break My Bank" and Akon's "My Girl".

Later, Iyaz did a duet called "You're My Only Shorty" with Demi Lovato, which is from Lovato's third studio album, Unbroken. He released a song with Travie McCoy titled "Pretty Girls" and later in the year a song titled "My Heart Broke" surfaced. Iyaz uploaded a duet song named, "Christmas Time" featuring Sha Sha Jones on to YouTube, A Christmas song which His Grandparents requested.

In 2013, a slew of tracks credited to Iyaz surfaced online, namely "Da Da Da", along with "Congrats", "What Is This Feeling" and "Too Sexy".

In 2014, after leaving his previous labels the year prior, Iyaz signed with new Los Angeles-based independent record label Rekless Music, which is distributed by the Alternative Distribution Alliance and Warner Music Group. Iyaz made a cover of Chris Brown's "Loyal" named "Comin' for Ya", followed by another cover months after of Magic!'s song "Rude" which he shared on SoundCloud. Iyaz tweeted in December 2014 he would release a single titled "One Million", and released a snippet of the song on SoundCloud. Iyaz released "One Million" on iTunes in Japan on 12 December 2014, the first single from his second album Aurora, released exclusively in Japan on 8 April 2015.

On 24 July 2015 Iyaz released the second single from Aurora, "Alive", featuring Nash Overstreet of Hot Chelle Rae. It was produced by J.D. "Boy Rekless" Salbego, the President/CEO of Rekless Music, Iyaz's new label, and Stuart Hart. On 23 September 2015, MTV exclusively premiered the official video of "Alive".

Discography

Studio albums

Extended plays

Singles

As lead artist

As featured artist

Other appearances

Notes

Awards and nominations

References

External links
 

1987 births
British Seventh-day Adventists
British Virgin Islands singers
Reggae fusion artists
Living people
People from Tortola
21st-century British singers